Kanae Hisami and Kotomi Takahata were the defending champions, but Hisami chose not to participate. Takahata partnered Jessy Rompies, but lost in the first round to Ankita Raina and Emily Webley-Smith.

Natela Dzalamidze and Veronika Kudermetova won the title, defeating Chang Kai-chen and Chuang Chia-jung in the final, 4–6, 6–3, [10–5].

Seeds

Draw

References 
 Draw

OEC Taipei WTA Challenger – Doubles
Taipei WTA Ladies Open